Odorico Politi (Udine, 27 January 1785 - Venice, 18 October 1846) was an Italian painter.

Life and career
Odorico Politi was born in Udine, and studied in Venice at the Accademia di Belle Arti with Teodoro Matteini. In 1812 he returned to Udine and began a career as a painter of neoclassical frescoes, specializing in historical and mythological subjects. Some of these frescoes can now be seen at the Palazzo Antonini and at Napoleon's Royal Palace in Venice. In 1831 he received an appointment as professor at the Accademia of Venice, where he had studied. Notable students include Pompeo Marino Molmenti, Antonio Dugoni, Fausto Antonioli and Cesare Dell'Acqua.

Works
Politi's frescoes with religious subjects are found in the churches of Attimis, Clauzetto, Felettano, Pavia di Udine, Tarcento, Trieste, Udine, Venice and Vito d'Asio. Selected works include:
Portrait of Canova - 1810 - Civic Museums of Udine
Portrait of Count GB Bartolini - 1823
The model of the painter - 1838
Santa Filomena, Rome rescued by angels - 1838 - Cathedral of Rovigo
Portrait of Abbot Angelo Dalmistro - 1839
Self Portrait - 1840 - Civic Museums of Udine

References

1785 births
1846 deaths
People from Udine
19th-century Italian painters
Italian male painters
Painters from Venice
Accademia di Belle Arti di Venezia alumni
Academic staff of the Accademia di Belle Arti di Venezia
Italian neoclassical painters
19th-century Italian male artists